Eulepidotis austrina is a moth of the family Erebidae first described by William Schaus in 1911. It is found in the Neotropical realm, including Costa Rica.

References

Moths described in 1911
austrina